Maruti Mane (10 August 1938 – 27 July 2010) was an Indian former wrestler who competed in the 1964 Summer Olympics.

Mane had a glorious run as a wrestler between 1962 and 1972 and did exceedingly well for the country in major championships. In the 1970 Commonwealth Games, he won silver in the unlimited freestyle event. In the 1962 Asian Games, he won gold in the 97 kg freestyle and the silver in the 97 kg Greco-Roman events.

Mane was crowned Hind Kesari in 1964 after defeating Rajasthan wrestler Mahiruddin. He was at one time listed among the best wrestlers in the world.

In his wrestling days, Mane used to work out for almost 10 to 12 hours daily. His fitness was said to be the reason for him lasting a good 11 minutes against them then all-conquering Russian wrestler Alexander Medved in 1967.

He was awarded with Dhyanchand Award in 2005 for his contribution to the wrestling.

International tournaments

References

External links
 
 

1938 births
2010 deaths
People from Sangli
Olympic wrestlers of India
Wrestlers at the 1964 Summer Olympics
Indian male sport wrestlers
Asian Games medalists in wrestling
Wrestlers at the 1962 Asian Games
Commonwealth Games medallists in wrestling
Commonwealth Games silver medallists for India
Recipients of the Dhyan Chand Award
Asian Games gold medalists for India
Asian Games silver medalists for India
Medalists at the 1962 Asian Games
Wrestlers at the 1970 British Commonwealth Games
Medallists at the 1970 British Commonwealth Games